Robert Emlen Boyers (December 25, 1876 – August 4, 1949) was a United States Army officer and American football player and coach. He served as the head football coach at the United States Military Academy from 1904 to 1905, compiling a record of 11–6–1. Boyers was born on December 25, 1876, and graduated from West Point in 1903. He served during World War I with the 3rd Infantry Division in France and with the 332nd Infantry Regiment in Italy. He lost his foot as the result of wounds and retired in 1919 with the rank of captain.

Head coaching record

References

1876 births
1949 deaths
19th-century players of American football
Army Black Knights football coaches
Army Black Knights football players
All-American college football players
United States Army personnel of World War I
United States Army officers
People from Bellaire, Ohio